opened in Buzen, Fukuoka Prefecture, Japan in 1974. In November 2017 the museum closed for several months for works on the ageing building and in February 2018 Buzen City appealed to the prefectural government for funds for a replacement facility.

See also
 List of National Treasures of Japan (archaeological materials)
 Kyushu Historical Museum
 List of Historic Sites of Japan (Fukuoka)

References

External links

 Kubote Historical Museum

Buzen, Fukuoka
Museums in Fukuoka Prefecture
Museums established in 1974
1974 establishments in Japan